Thujopsis is a genus of conifers in the cypress family (Cupressaceae), the sole member of which is Thujopsis dolabrata. It is endemic to Japan, where it is named asunaro. It is similar to the closely related genus Thuja (arborvitae), differing in the broader, thicker leaves and thick cones. It is also called hiba, false arborvitae, or hiba arborvitae.

A popular allegory for the meaning behind asunaro is asu wa hinoki ni narou, literally "tomorrow it will become a hinoki cypress", i.e. the tree looks like a smaller version of the common hinoki cypress. In Japan, other than being called asunaro, it also goes by the name hiba. There are also a few regional variations, with asunaro being called ate in Ishikawa, and atebi on Sado island.

Thujopsis is a medium to large evergreen tree, reaching up to 40 m tall and 1.5 m trunk diameter, with red-brown bark which peels in vertical strips. The leaves are arranged in decussate pairs, scale-like, 3–10 mm long, glossy green above, and marked with vivid white stomatal bands below; they have a distinctive thick, almost fleshy texture. The seed cones are ovoid, 7–15 mm long and 6–10 mm diameter, with 6–12 thick scales, brown with a violet-white wax bloom when fresh. 

There are two varieties:
 Thujopsis dolabrata var. dolabrata. Central and southern Japan. Shoots less densely branched with slightly larger leaves, and strongly thickened cone scales.
 Thujopsis dolabrata var. hondai. Northern Japan. Shoots more densely branched with slightly smaller leaves, and less thickened cone scales.

Uses
The asunaro is a valued ornamental tree both in its native Japan, where it is commonly planted around temples as well as in gardens, and also in Europe and North America. In the latter two regions, planting is confined to areas with good rainfall or in gardens with reliable irrigation, as the species is not drought tolerant. In the UK has gained the Royal Horticultural Society's Award of Garden Merit. 

It is also used to a small extent in forestry in Japan, grown for the valuable wood, which is durable and scented, similar to that of Thuja plicata.

References

 Dictionary.goo.ne.jp - あすなろ

Cupressaceae
Monotypic conifer genera
Endemic flora of Japan
Trees of Japan
Least concern plants
Five sacred trees of Kiso